The British Association of Friends of Museums (BAFM) is an independent organisation for Friends, supporters, and volunteers in museums, galleries, and heritage sites within the United Kingdom. It was established in 1973.
It is a registered charity no 1159670.
BAFM represents around 200,000 Friends and volunteers in the UK. It provides a network of support from people with practical experience of running Friends organisations and is a central source of information. It has links with UK Area Museum Councils and other national UK organisations such as:

 Association of Independent Museums(AIM)
 Charity Commission for England and Wales
 Department for Digital, Culture, Media and Sport(DCMS) (UK government)
 Museums Association(MA)
 National Council for Voluntary Organisations(NCVO)

BAFM is a member of the World Federation of Friends of Museums. It organizes national and regional events, provides a Handbook for Friends, a Handbook for Heritage Volunteer Managers & Administrators, and many information sheets. The BAFM publish a biannual Journal.

President 
 2005-2014 Loyd Grossman OBE, FSA.

 Dame Rosemary Butler DBE.

Annual Conferences 
1989 Annual Conference at Bristol.
2008 35th Annual Conference at Penzance.
2009 36th Annual Conference and AGM at York.
2010 BAFM 37th Annual Conference & AGM Isle of Man 24–26 September 2010.
2014 41st Annual Conference at Swansea.
2015 42nd Annual Conference at Cheltenham.
2016 43rd Annual Conference at the Ironbridge Gorge Museum, Coalbrookdale.
2017 44th Annual Conference at the London Transport Museum.
2018 Annual Conference at Newcastle upon Tyne. The winner of the first best newsletter award was The Black Country Museum Friends.
2019 Annual Conference at Reading, Berkshire. The winner of the best newsletter was the Lyme Regis Museum Friends.
2020 AGM  held remotely.
2021 Annual AGM on Zoom.
2022 49th Annual Conference at Dundee. October 2022
2023 50th Annual Conference at Doncaster
2024 51st Annual Conference at Southampton

Awards 
Since 2021 BAFM has operated an IMPACT award currently (2022) £1k.

 The Friends of The Egypt Centre in Swansea were winners of 2022 Impact Award. Runners Up were The Friends of Beamish Museum. Highly commended were:
The Friends of Lyme Regis Museum, The Friends of Wisbech and Fenland Museum, 
Herefordshire Museum Service Support Group and The Friends of Reading Museum. 

2021 Impact Winners - Friends of Upminster Windmill. Highly Commended were: Costume and Textile Association, The Friends of the Judges Lodgings, Lancaster and The Friends of The Whitworth.

Robert Logan Award

 2015 Jasmine Farram of Tunbridge Wells Museum and Art Gallery.
 2019 Holiday Donaldson

References

External links 

Organizations established in 1973
Museum organizations
Non-profit organisations based in the United Kingdom
1973 establishments in the United Kingdom